Sogard, also spelt Søgård or Søgaard, is a surname of Danish or Norwegian origin. Notable people with the surname include:

Aage William Søgaard (1933–2010), Norwegian trade unionist and politician
Alex Sogard (born 1987), American baseball coach and former player
Allan Søgaard Larsen (born 1965), Danish businessman
Allan Søgaard (born 1979), Danish footballer
Eric Sogard (born 1986), American baseball player
Espen Søgård (born 1979), Norwegian footballer
Frederik Søgaard (born 1997), Danish badminton player
Kim Søgaard (born 1964), former Norwegian ice hockey player
Linea Søgaard-Lidell (born 1987), Danish politician
Lotte Søgaard-Andersen (born 1959), Danish scientist
Mads Søgaard (born 2000), Danish ice hockey player
Michael Søgaard (born 1969), Danish badminton player
Morten Søgård (born 1956), Norwegian curler
Nina Munch-Søgaard (born 1987), retired Norwegian tennis player
Runar Søgaard, Norwegian life coach
Phil Sogard (born 1933), American film and television director
Poul Søgaard (1923–2016), Danish politician

References

Surnames of Danish origin
Surnames of Norwegian origin